John Andrew "Drew" Crompton is a Judge of the Commonwealth Court of Pennsylvania. Previously, he served as chief of staff and counsel for Pennsylvania Senate Pro-Tempore Joe Scarnati. He served as deputy campaign manager for policy for Lynn Swann's 2006 campaign for Governor of Pennsylvania. Prior to that, he was chief counsel for Scarnati's predecessor as Pennsylvania Senate Pro-Tempore, Robert Jubelirer.

Career
The Pennsylvania Report named him to the 2003 "The Pennsylvania Report Power 75" list of influential figures in Pennsylvania politics and noted that Crompton and his colleague Donna Malpezzi were the best attorneys in the Pennsylvania State Capitol."  In 2002, he was named to the PoliticsPA list of "Rising Stars" in Pennsylvania politics.

The political newspaper The Insider called him the next generation's Mike Long and Steve MacNett.

The Caucus team of reporters uncovered that Drew Crompton authorized the legal representation of former senate employee Justin Ferranti, who had been accused of sexually harassing two female senate staff, Crompton defended his actions publicly.

References

Year of birth missing (living people)
Living people
Dickinson College alumni
Widener University Commonwealth Law School alumni
Employees of the Pennsylvania General Assembly
Pennsylvania lawyers
Judges of the Commonwealth Court of Pennsylvania